Gigantothrips is a genus of thrips in the family Phlaeothripidae.

Species
 Gigantothrips afer
 Gigantothrips baculifer
 Gigantothrips brevicornis
 Gigantothrips caudatus
 Gigantothrips elegans
 Gigantothrips gallicola
 Gigantothrips gardneri
 Gigantothrips halidayi
 Gigantothrips marshalli
 Gigantothrips micrurus
 Gigantothrips modestus
 Gigantothrips nigripes
 Gigantothrips nigrodentatus
 Gigantothrips ochroscelis
 Gigantothrips pontis
 Gigantothrips priesneri
 Gigantothrips rossi
 Gigantothrips schenklingi
 Gigantothrips seshadrii
 Gigantothrips tibialis
 Gigantothrips vuilleti
 Gigantothrips xynos

References

Phlaeothripidae
Thrips genera